Glenn Thomas Trewartha (1896 – 1984) was an American geographer of Cornish American descent.

Life 
He graduated from the University of Wisconsin–Madison, with a Ph.D. in 1924. He taught at the University of Wisconsin.

He gave an address to the Association of American Geographers, "A Case for Population Geography", in which he argued that "fundamentally geography is anthropocentric, and if such is the case, that numbers,  densities  and  qualities  of  the population provide the essential background for all geography. Population provide the essential background for  all  geography. He also wrote about climate, explaining that the atmosphere was like "a pane of glass in a greenhouse... thus maintaining surface temperatures considerably higher than they otherwise would be."

Awards
1926 Guggenheim Fellowship

Works
 "The earliest map of Galena, Illinois" Wisconsin Magazine Of History. Volume: 23 /Issue: 1 (1939–1940) 
A Reconnaissance geography of Japan, University of Wisconsin, 1934
Elements of geography physical and cultural, Glenn Thomas Trewartha, Vernor Clifford Finch, Mc Graw-Hill, 1942
Japan, a physical, cultural and regional geography, University of Wisconsin press, 1945
An introduction to climate, McGraw-Hill, 1954
Japan, a geography, Milwaukee: University of Wisconsin press, 1965
An introduction to climate McGraw-Hill, 1968
The More developed realm: a geography of its population, Editor Glenn Thomas Trewartha, Pergamon Press, 1978, 
The Earth's problem climates, University of Wisconsin Press, 1981,

See also
 Trewartha climate classification

References

External links
"Booknotes", American Sociological Review, Vol. 10, No. 3 (Jun., 1945), pp. 452–456
Forum: Fifty years since Trewartha: The Past, Present, and Future of Population Geography
 Hartshorne, R. and Borchert, J. (1988), Glenn T. Trewartha, 1896–1984. Annals of the Association of American Geographers, 78: 728–735. 

American geographers
American people of Cornish descent
1896 births
1984 deaths
University of Wisconsin–Madison alumni
University of Wisconsin–Madison faculty
Presidents of the American Association of Geographers
20th-century geographers